Edwards County is a county located on the Edwards Plateau in the U.S. state of Texas. As of the 2020 census its population was 1,422. The county seat is Rocksprings. The county was created in 1858 and organized in 1883. It is named for Haden Edwards, an early settler of Nacogdoches, Texas. The Edwards Aquifer and Edwards Plateau are named after the county by reason of their locations.

History

 The early inhabitants were Lipan Apache and Comanche.
 1762 Looking for protection from Comanches, Lipan Apache chief El Gran Cabezón persuades Franciscans and the Spanish military to establish San Lorenzo de la Santa Cruz Mission on the Nueces River. The Mission was abandoned in 1771.
 1825  Virginia born Haden Harrison Edwards joins forces with Stephen F. Austin and contracts with Coahuila y Tejas to move 800 families into east Texas. In 1826 Edwards announces the creation of the Republic of Fredonia near Nacogdoches, an early attempt to secede from Mexico. Stephen F. Austin joins forces with Mexico against Edwards. Haden Edwards flees in 1827 to Louisiana for his safety, returns to Texas, and spends the rest of his life in Nacogdoches.
 1858 Edwards County is formed from Bexar County.
 1871 Clint Smith, age 11,  and brother Jeff Smith, age 9, are kidnapped by Indians near Rocksprings.
 1882 W.J. Greer settles a sheep camp at Rocksprings.
 1883 Edwards County is officially organized and named for Haden Harrison Edwards.
 1884 Francis Winan cattle and sheep ranch at Rocksprings.
 1885 A.O. Burr sets up farming at Rocksprings.
 1891 County seat becomes Rocksprings. The County Courthouse is built by architects Ben Davey and Bruno Schort in the Romanesque Revival Style.
 1898 Rocksprings Telephone Company is formed.
 1913 Edwards loses land in its eastern section to Real County.
 1927 A tornado hits Rocksprings.
 1940 Rocksprings calls itself the "Top-o-the-World" in mohair production, which peaks that year.
 1946 Oil is discovered in the county.
 1991 Kickapoo Cavern State Park,  in both Edwards and Kinney County opens to the public.
 1992 Devil's Sinkhole State Natural Area near Rockspring opens to the public. It is the home to the largest single-chambered cavern and third-deepest in the state.

Geography

Major highways
  U.S. Highway 277
  U.S. Highway 377
  State Highway 41
  State Highway 55

Adjacent counties
 Sutton County (north)
 Kimble County (northeast)
 Kerr County (east)
 Real County (southeast)
 Uvalde County (southeast)
 Kinney County (south)
 Val Verde County (west)

Demographics

Note: the US Census treats Hispanic/Latino as an ethnic category. This table excludes Latinos from the racial categories and assigns them to a separate category. Hispanics/Latinos can be of any race.

As of the census of 2000, 2,162 people, 801 households, and 586 families resided in the county. The population density was less than 1/km2 (1/mi2). The 1,217 housing units averaged 1 per mi2 (<1/km2). The racial makeup of the county was 83.26% White, 0.79% African American, 0.79% Native American, 0.14% Asian, 12.72% from other races, and 2.31% from two or more races. About 45.05% of the population was Hispanic or Latino of any race.

Of the 801 households, 31.70% had children under the age of 18 living with them, 60.80% were married couples living together, 8.90% had a female householder with no husband present, and 26.80% were not families. About 24.70% of all households were made up of individuals, and 13.50% had someone living alone who was 65 years of age or older. The average household size was 2.66 and the average family size was 3.20.

In the county, the population was distributed as 28.50% under the age of 18, 6.50% from 18 to 24, 23.20% from 25 to 44, 25.70% from 45 to 64, and 16.20% who were 65 years of age or older. The median age was 39 years. For every 100 females, there were 102.60 males. For every 100 females age 18 and over, there were 98.20 males.

The median income for a household in the county was $25,298, and for a family was $27,083. Males had a median income of $21,912 versus $14,907 for females. The per capita income for the county was $12,691. About 24.60% of families and 31.60% of the population were below the poverty line, including 47.40% of those under age 18 and 17.70% of those age 65 or over.

Communities

Town
 Rocksprings (county seat)

Census-designated places
 Barksdale

Other unincorporated communities
 Carta Valley

Politics

Education
School districts include:
 Rocksprings Independent School District
 Nueces Canyon Consolidated Independent School District

The designated community college is Southwest Texas Junior College.

See also

 List of museums in Central Texas
 National Register of Historic Places listings in Edwards County, Texas
 Recorded Texas Historic Landmarks in Edwards County

References

External links

 Edwards County in Handbook of Texas Online
 Edwards County Profile from the Texas Association of Counties

 
1883 establishments in Texas
Populated places established in 1883
Texas Hill Country
Majority-minority counties in Texas